

Africa

President – Abdelmadjid Tebboune, President of Algeria (2019–present)
Prime Minister – Abdelaziz Djerad, Prime Minister of Algeria (2019–2021)

President – João Lourenço, President of Angola (2017–present)

President – Patrice Talon, President of Benin (2016–present)

President – Mokgweetsi Masisi, President of Botswana (2018–present)

President – Roch Marc Christian Kaboré, President of Burkina Faso (2015–2022)
Prime Minister – Christophe Joseph Marie Dabiré, Prime Minister of Burkina Faso (2019–2021)

President –
Pierre Nkurunziza, President of Burundi (2005–2020)
Évariste Ndayishimiye, President of Burundi (2020–present)
Prime Minister – Alain-Guillaume Bunyoni, Prime Minister of Burundi (2020–present)

President – Paul Biya, President of Cameroon (1982–present)
Prime Minister – Joseph Ngute, Prime Minister of Cameroon (2019–present)

President – Jorge Carlos Fonseca, President of Cape Verde (2011–2021)
Prime Minister – Ulisses Correia e Silva, Prime Minister of Cape Verde (2016–present)

President  – Faustin-Archange Touadéra, President of the Central African Republic (2016–present)
Prime Minister - Firmin Ngrébada, Prime Minister of the Central African Republic (2019–2021)

President – Idriss Déby, President of Chad (1990–2021)

President – Azali Assoumani, President of the Comoros (2016–present)

President – Denis Sassou Nguesso, President of the Republic of the Congo (1997–present)
Prime Minister – Clément Mouamba, Prime Minister of the Republic of the Congo (2016–2021)

President – Félix Tshisekedi, President of the Democratic Republic of the Congo (2019–present)
Prime Minister – Sylvestre Ilunga, Prime Minister of the Democratic Republic of the Congo (2019–2021)

President – Ismaïl Omar Guelleh, President of Djibouti (1999–present)
Prime Minister – Abdoulkader Kamil Mohamed, Prime Minister of Djibouti (2013–present)

President – Abdel Fattah el-Sisi, President of Egypt (2014–present)
Prime Minister – Moustafa Madbouly, Prime Minister of Egypt (2018–present)

President – Teodoro Obiang Nguema Mbasogo, President of Equatorial Guinea (1979–present)
Prime Minister – Francisco Pascual Obama Asue, Prime Minister of Equatorial Guinea (2016–2023)

President – Isaias Afwerki, President of Eritrea (1991–present)

Monarch – Mswati III, King of Eswatini (1986–present)
Prime Minister –
Ambrose Mandvulo Dlamini, Prime Minister of Eswatini (2018–2020)
Themba N. Masuku, Acting Prime Minister of Eswatini (2020–2021)

President – Sahle-Work Zewde, President of Ethiopia (2018–present)
Prime Minister – Abiy Ahmed, Prime Minister of Ethiopia (2018–present)

President – Ali Bongo Ondimba, President of Gabon (2009–present)
Prime Minister –
Julien Nkoghe Bekale, Prime Minister of Gabon (2019–2020)
Rose Christiane Raponda, Prime Minister of Gabon (2020–2023)

President – Adama Barrow, President of the Gambia (2017–present)

President – Nana Akufo-Addo, President of Ghana (2017–present)

President – Alpha Condé, President of Guinea (2010–2021)
Prime Minister – Ibrahima Kassory Fofana, Prime Minister of Guinea (2018–2021)

President –
José Mário Vaz, Acting President of Guinea-Bissau (2019–2020)
Umaro Sissoco Embaló, President of Guinea-Bissau (2020–present)
Prime Minister –
Aristides Gomes, Prime Minister of Guinea-Bissau (2018–2020)
Nuno Gomes Nabiam, Prime Minister of Guinea-Bissau (2020–present)

President – Alassane Ouattara, President of the Ivory Coast (2010–present)
Prime Minister –
Amadou Gon Coulibaly, Prime Minister of the Ivory Coast (2017–2020)
Hamed Bakayoko, Acting Prime Minister of the Ivory Coast (2020)
Hamed Bakayoko, Prime Minister of the Ivory Coast (2020-2021)

President – william Ruto, President of Kenya (2022-present)
Deputy President- Rigathi Gachagua,Deputy president of Kenya (2022-present)
Prime Cabinet Secretary{Minister}-Musalia Mudavadi (2022-present)

Monarch – Letsie III, King of Lesotho (1996–present)
Prime Minister – 
Tom Thabane, Prime Minister of Lesotho (2017-2020)
Moeketsi Majoro, Prime Minister of Lesotho (2020–present)

President – George Weah, President of Liberia (2018–present)
Libya
 Government of House of Representatives of Libya  (Government of Libya internationally recognised to 12 March 2016)
Head of State – Aguila Saleh Issa, Chairman of the House of Representatives of Libya (co-claimant, 2014–2021)
Prime Minister – Abdullah al-Thani, Prime Minister of Libya (co-claimant, 2014–2021)
  Government of National Accord of Libya  (Interim government internationally recognised as the sole legitimate government of Libya from 12 March 2016)
Head of State – Fayez al-Sarraj, Chairman of the Presidential Council of Libya (co-claimant, 2016–2021)
Prime Minister – Fayez al-Sarraj, Prime Minister of Libya (co-claimant, 2016–2021)

President – Andry Rajoelina, President of Madagascar (2019–present)
Prime Minister – Christian Ntsay, Prime Minister of Madagascar (2018–present)

President –
Peter Mutharika, President of Malawi (2014–2020)
Lazarus Chakwera, President of Malawi (2020–present)

President –
Ibrahim Boubacar Keïta, President of Mali (2013–2020)
Assimi Goïta, Head of State of Mali (2020)
Bah Ndaw, Interim President of Mali (2020–2021)
Prime Minister –
Boubou Cissé, Prime Minister of Mali (2019–2020)
Moctar Ouane, Interim Prime Minister of Mali (2020–2021)

President – Mohamed Ould Ghazouani, President of Mauritania (2019–present)
Prime Minister –
Ismail Ould Bedde Ould Cheikh Sidiya, Prime Minister of Mauritania (2019–2020)
Mohamed Ould Bilal, Prime Minister of Mauritania (2020–present)

President – Pritvirajsing Roopun, President of Mauritius (2019–present)
Prime Minister – Pravind Jugnauth, Prime Minister of Mauritius (2017–present)

Monarch – Mohammed VI, King of Morocco (1999–present)
Prime Minister – Saadeddine Othmani, Head of Government of Morocco (2017–2021)

President – Filipe Nyusi, President of Mozambique (2015–present)
Prime Minister – Carlos Agostinho do Rosário, Prime Minister of Mozambique (2015–2022)

President – Hage Geingob, President of Namibia (2015–present)
Prime Minister – Saara Kuugongelwa, Prime Minister of Namibia (2015–present)

President – Mahamadou Issoufou, President of Niger (2011–2021)
Prime Minister – Brigi Rafini, Prime Minister of Niger (2011–2021)

President – Muhammadu Buhari, President of Nigeria (2015–present)

President – Paul Kagame, President of Rwanda (2000–present)
Prime Minister – Édouard Ngirente, Prime Minister of Rwanda (2017–present)
 (Overseas Territory of the United Kingdom)
Governor – Philip Rushbrook, Governor of Saint Helena (2019–present)

President – Evaristo Carvalho, President of São Tomé and Príncipe (2016–2021)
Prime Minister – Jorge Bom Jesus, Prime Minister of São Tomé and Príncipe (2018–present)

President – Macky Sall, President of Senegal (2012–present)

President –
Danny Faure, President of Seychelles (2016–2020)
Wavel Ramkalawan, President of Seychelles (2020–present)

President – Julius Maada Bio, President of Sierra Leone (2018–present)
Chief Minister –
David J. Francis, Chief Minister of Sierra Leone (2018–2021)

President – Mohamed Abdullahi Mohamed, President of Somalia (2017–present)
Prime Minister –
Hassan Ali Khaire, Prime Minister of Somalia (2017–2020)
Mahdi Mohammed Gulaid, Acting Prime Minister of Somalia (2020)
Mohamed Hussein Roble, Prime Minister of Somalia (2020–present)
 (unrecognized, secessionist state)
President – Muse Bihi Abdi, President of Somaliland (2017–present)

President – Cyril Ramaphosa, President of South Africa (2018–present)

President – Salva Kiir Mayardit, President of South Sudan (2005–present)

President – Abdel Fattah al-Burhan, Leader of the Sovereignty Council (2019–present)
Prime Minister – Abdalla Hamdok, Prime Minister of Sudan (2019-2021)

President – John Magufuli, President of Tanzania (2015–2021)
Prime Minister – Kassim Majaliwa, Prime Minister of Tanzania (2015–present)

President – Faure Gnassingbé, President of Togo (2005–present)
Prime Minister – 
Komi Sélom Klassou, Prime Minister of Togo (2015–2020)
Victoire Tomegah Dogbé, Prime Minister of Togo (2020–present)

President – Kais Saied, President of Tunisia (2019–present)
Prime Minister –
Youssef Chahed, Prime Minister of Tunisia (2016–2020)
Elyes Fakhfakh, Prime Minister of Tunisia (2020)
Hichem Mechichi, Prime Minister of Tunisia (2020–2021)

President – Yoweri Museveni, President of Uganda (1986–present)
Prime Minister –
Ruhakana Rugunda, Prime Minister of Uganda (2014–2021)
 (self-declared, partially recognised state)
President – Brahim Ghali, President of Western Sahara (2016–present)
Prime Minister –
Mohamed Wali Akeik, Prime Minister of Western Sahara (2018–2020)
Bouchraya Hammoudi Bayoun, Prime Minister of Western Sahara (2020–present)

President – Edgar Lungu, President of Zambia (2015–2021)

President – Emmerson Mnangagwa, President of Zimbabwe (2017–present)

Asia
 Afghanistan
President – Ashraf Ghani, President of Afghanistan (2014–2021)
Prime Minister – Abdullah Abdullah, Chief Executive Officer of Afghanistan (2014–2020)

Monarch – Sheikh Hamad bin Isa Al Khalifa, King of Bahrain (1999–present)
Prime Minister –
Prince Khalifa bin Salman Al Khalifa, Prime Minister of Bahrain (1970–2020)
Prince Salman bin Hamad Al Khalifa, Prime Minister of Bahrain (2020–present)

President – Abdul Hamid, President of Bangladesh (2013–present)
Prime Minister – Sheikh Hasina, Prime Minister of Bangladesh (2009–present)

Monarch – Jigme Khesar Namgyel Wangchuck, King of Bhutan (2006–present)
Prime Minister – Lotay Tshering, Prime Minister of Bhutan (2018–present)

Monarch – Hassanal Bolkiah, Sultan of Brunei (1967–present)
Prime Minister – Hassanal Bolkiah, Prime Minister of Brunei (1984–present)

Monarch – Norodom Sihamoni, King of Cambodia (2004–present)
Prime Minister – Hun Sen, Prime Minister of Cambodia (1985–present)

Communist Party Leader – Xi Jinping, General Secretary of the Chinese Communist Party (2012–present)
President – Xi Jinping, President of China (2013–present)
Premier – Li Keqiang, Premier of the State Council of China (2013–present)

President – Francisco Guterres, President of East Timor (2017–2022)
Prime Minister – Taur Matan Ruak, Prime Minister of East Timor (2018–present)

President – Ram Nath Kovind, President of India (2017–2022)
Prime Minister – Narendra Modi, Prime Minister of India (2014–present)

President – Joko Widodo, President of Indonesia (2014–present)

Supreme Leader – Ali Khamenei, Supreme Leader of Iran (1989–present)
President – Hassan Rouhani, President of Iran (2013–2021)

President – Barham Salih, President of Iraq (2018–2022)
Prime Minister –
 Adil Abdul-Mahdi, Prime Minister of Iraq (2018–2020)
 Mustafa Al-Kadhimi, Prime Minister of Iraq (2020–2022)

Monarch – Naruhito, Emperor of Japan (2019–present)
Prime Minister –
Shinzo Abe, Prime Minister of Japan (2012–2020)
Yoshihide Suga, Prime Minister of Japan (2020–2021)

Monarch – Abdullah II, King of Jordan (1999–present)
Prime Minister –
Omar Razzaz, Prime Minister of Jordan (2018–2020)
Bisher Al-Khasawneh, Prime Minister of Jordan (2020–present)

President – Kassym-Dzomart Tokayev, President of Kazakhstan (2019–present)
Prime Minister – Askar Mamin, Prime Minister of Kazakhstan (2019–2021)

Communist Party Leader – Kim Jong-un, Chairman of the Workers' Party of Korea (2012–present)
De facto Head of State – Kim Jong-un, Chairman of the State Affairs Commission of North Korea (2011–present)
De jure Head of State – Choe Ryong-hae, Chairman of the Presidium of the Supreme People's Assembly of North Korea (2019–present)
Premier –
 Kim Jae-ryong, Premier of the Cabinet of North Korea (2019–2020)
 Kim Tok-hun, Premier of the Cabinet of North Korea (2020–present)

President – Moon Jae-in, President of South Korea (2017–2022)
Prime Minister –
Lee Nak-yon, Prime Minister of South Korea (2017–2020)
Chung Sye-kyun, Prime Minister of South Korea (2020–2021)

Monarch –
Sheikh Sabah Al-Ahmad Al-Jaber Al-Sabah, Emir of Kuwait (2006–2020)
Sheikh Nawaf Al-Ahmad Al-Jaber Al-Sabah, Emir of Kuwait (2020–present)
Prime Minister – Sheikh Sabah Al-Khalid Al-Sabah, Prime Minister of Kuwait (2019–present)

President –
Sooronbay Jeenbekov, President of Kyrgyzstan (2017–2020)
Sadyr Dzaparov, Acting President of Kyrgyzstan (2020)
Talant Mamytov, Acting President of Kyrgyzstan (2020–2021)
Prime Minister –
Mukhammedkalyi Abylgaziev, Prime Minister of Kyrgyzstan (2018–2020)
Kubatbek Boronov, Prime Minister of Kyrgyzstan (2020)
Sadyr Dzaparov, Prime Minister of Kyrgyzstan (2020–2021)
Artyom Novikov, Acting Prime Minister of Kyrgyzstan (2020–2021)

Communist Party Leader – Bounnhang Vorachith, General Secretary of the Lao People's Revolutionary Party (2016–2021)
President – Bounnhang Vorachith, President of Laos (2016–2021)
Prime Minister – Thongloun Sisoulith, Prime Minister of Laos (2016-2021)

President – Michel Aoun, President of Lebanon (2016–2022)
Prime Minister –
Saad Hariri, President of the Council of Ministers (2016–2020)
Hassan Diab, President of the Council of Ministers (2020–2021)

Monarch – Abdullah, Yang di-Pertuan Agong of Malaysia (2019–present)
Prime Minister – 
Mahathir Mohamad, Prime Minister of Malaysia (2018–2020)
Muhyiddin Yassin, Prime Minister of Malaysia (2020–2021)

President – Ibrahim Mohamed Solih, President of the Maldives (2018–present)

President – Khaltmaagiin Battulga, President of Mongolia (2017–2021)
Prime Minister – Ukhnaagiin Khürelsükh, Prime Minister of Mongolia (2017–2021)

President – Win Myint, President of Myanmar (2018–2021)
Prime Minister – Aung San Suu Kyi, State Counsellor of Myanmar (2016–2021)

President – Bidhya Devi Bhandari, President of Nepal (2015–present)
Prime Minister – KP Sharma Oli, Prime Minister of Nepal (2018–2021)

Monarch –
Qaboos bin Said al Said, Sultan of Oman (1970–2020)
Haitham bin Tariq Al Said, Sultan of Oman (2020–present)
Prime Minister –
Qaboos bin Said al Said, Prime Minister of Oman (1972–2020)
Haitham bin Tariq Al Said, Prime Minister of Oman (2020–present)

President – Arif Alvi, President of Pakistan (2018–present)
Prime Minister – Imran Khan, Prime Minister of Pakistan (2018–2022)

President – Mahmoud Abbas, President of Palestine (2005–present)
Prime Minister – Mohammad Shtayyeh, Prime Minister of Palestine (2019–present)

President – Rodrigo Duterte, President of the Philippines (2016–2022)

Monarch – Sheikh Tamim bin Hamad Al Thani, Emir of Qatar (2013–present)
Prime Minister –
Sheikh Abdullah bin Nasser bin Khalifa Al Thani, Prime Minister of Qatar (2013–2020)
Sheikh Khalid bin Khalifa bin Abdul Aziz Al Thani, Prime Minister of Qatar (2020–present)

Monarch – Salman, King of Saudi Arabia (2015–present)
Prime Minister – Salman, Prime Minister of Saudi Arabia (2015–2022)

President – Halimah Yacob, President of Singapore (2017–present)
Prime Minister – Lee Hsien Loong, Prime Minister of Singapore (2004–present)

President – Gotabaya Rajapaksa, President of Sri Lanka (2019–2022)
Prime Minister – Mahinda Rajapaksa, Prime Minister of Sri Lanka (2019–2022)
Syria

President – Bashar al-Assad, President of Syria (2000–present)
Prime Minister –
 Imad Khamis, Prime Minister of Syria (2016–2020)
 Hussein Arnous, Prime Minister of Syria (2020–present)
 (partially recognised, rival government)
President – 
Anas al-Abdah, President of the Syrian National Coalition (2019–2020)
Naser al-Hariri, President of the Syrian National Coalition (2020–2021)
Prime Minister – Abdurrahman Mustafa, Prime Minister of the Syrian National Coalition (2019–present)

President – Tsai Ing-wen, President of Taiwan (2016–present)
Premier – Su Tseng-chang, President of the Executive Yuan of Taiwan (2019–2023)

President – Emomali Rahmon, President of Tajikistan (1992–present)
Prime Minister – Kokhir Rasulzoda, Prime Minister of Tajikistan (2013–present)

Monarch – Vajiralongkorn, King of Thailand (2016–present)
Prime Minister – Prayut Chan-o-cha, Prime Minister of Thailand (2014–present)

President – Recep Tayyip Erdoğan, President of Turkey (2014–present)

President – Gurbanguly Berdimuhamedow, President of Turkmenistan (2006–2022)

President – Sheikh Khalifa bin Zayed Al Nahyan, President of the United Arab Emirates (2004–2022)
Prime Minister – Sheikh Mohammed bin Rashid Al Maktoum, Prime Minister of the United Arab Emirates (2006–present)

President – Shavkat Mirziyoyev, President of Uzbekistan (2016–present)
Prime Minister – Abdulla Aripov, Prime Minister of Uzbekistan (2016–present)

Communist Party Leader – Nguyễn Phú Trọng, General Secretary of the Communist Party of Vietnam (2011–present)
President – Nguyễn Phú Trọng, President of Vietnam (2018–2021)
Prime Minister – Nguyễn Xuân Phúc, Prime Minister of Vietnam (2016–2021)
Yemen

President – Abdrabbuh Mansur Hadi, President of Yemen (2012–present)
Prime Minister – Maeen Abdulmalik Saeed, Prime Minister of Yemen (2018–present)
  Supreme Political Council (unrecognised, rival government)
Head of State – Mahdi al-Mashat, Head of the Supreme Political Council of Yemen (2018–present)
Prime Minister – Abdel-Aziz bin Habtour, Prime Minister of Yemen (2016–present)

Europe

President – Ilir Meta, President of Albania (2017–present)
Prime Minister – Edi Rama, Prime Minister of Albania (2013–present)

Monarchs –
French Co-Prince – Emmanuel Macron, French Co-prince of Andorra (2017–present)
Co-Prince's Representative – Patrick Strzoda (2017–present)
Episcopal Co-Prince – Archbishop Joan Enric Vives Sicília, Episcopal Co-prince of Andorra (2003–present)
Co-Prince's Representative – Josep Maria Mauri (2012–present)
Prime Minister – Xavier Espot Zamora, Head of Government of Andorra (2019–present)

President – Armen Sarkissian, President of Armenia (2018–2022)
Prime Minister – Nikol Pashinyan, Prime Minister of Armenia (2018–present)

President – Alexander Van der Bellen, Federal President of Austria (2017–present)
Chancellor – 
Brigitte Bierlein, Federal Chancellor of Austria (2019–2020)
Sebastian Kurz, Federal Chancellor of Austria (2020–2021)

President – Ilham Aliyev, President of Azerbaijan (2003–present)
Prime Minister – Ali Asadov, Prime Minister of Azerbaijan (2019–present)

President – Alexander Lukashenko, President of Belarus (1994–present)
Prime Minister –
Syarhey Rumas, Prime Minister of Belarus (2018–2020)
Roman Golovchenko, Prime Minister of Belarus (2020–present)

Monarch – Philippe, King of the Belgians (2013–present)
Prime Minister –
 Sophie Wilmès, Prime Minister of Belgium (2019–2020)
 Alexander De Croo, Prime Minister of Belgium (2020–present)

Head of State – Presidency of Bosnia and Herzegovina
Bosniak Member – Šefik Džaferović (2018–2022; Chairman of the Presidency of Bosnia and Herzegovina, 2020)
Croat Member – Željko Komšić (2018–present; Chairman of the Presidency of Bosnia and Herzegovina, 2019–2020)
Serb Member – Milorad Dodik (2018–2022; Chairman of the Presidency of Bosnia and Herzegovina, 2020–2021)
Prime Minister – Zoran Tegeltija, Chairman of the Council of Ministers of Bosnia and Herzegovina (2019–2023)
High Representative – Valentin Inzko, High Representative for Bosnia and Herzegovina (2009–2021)

President – Rumen Radev, President of Bulgaria (2017–present)
Prime Minister – Boyko Borisov, Prime Minister of Bulgaria (2017–2021)

President –
Kolinda Grabar-Kitarović, President of Croatia (2015–2020)
Zoran Milanović, President of Croatia (2020–present)
Prime Minister – Andrej Plenković, Prime Minister of Croatia (2016–present)

President – Nicos Anastasiades, President of Cyprus (2013–present)
 (unrecognised, secessionist state)
President –
Mustafa Akıncı, President of Northern Cyprus (2015–2020)
Ersin Tatar, President of Northern Cyprus (2020–present)
Prime Minister –
Ersin Tatar, Prime Minister of Northern Cyprus (2019–2020)
Kudret Özersay, Acting Prime Minister of Northern Cyprus (2020)
Ersan Saner, Prime Minister of Northern Cyprus (2020–2021)

President – Miloš Zeman, President of the Czech Republic (2013–present)
Prime Minister – Andrej Babiš, Prime Minister of the Czech Republic (2017–2021)

Monarch – Margrethe II, Queen of Denmark (1972–present)
Prime Minister – Mette Frederiksen, Prime Minister of Denmark (2019–present)

President – Kersti Kaljulaid, President of Estonia (2016–2021)
Prime Minister – Jüri Ratas, Prime Minister of Estonia (2016–2021)

President – Sauli Niinistö, President of Finland (2012–present)
Prime Minister – Sanna Marin, Prime Minister of Finland (2019–present)

President – Emmanuel Macron, President of France (2017–present)
Prime Minister –
 Édouard Philippe, Prime Minister of France (2017–2020)
 Jean Castex, Prime Minister of France (2020–present)

President – Salome Zurabishvili, President of Georgia (2018–present)
Prime Minister – Giorgi Gakharia, Prime Minister of Georgia (2019–2021)
 (partially recognised, secessionist state)
President –
Raul Khajimba, President of Abkhazia (2014–2020)
Valeri Bganba, Acting President of Abkhazia (2020)
Aslan Bzhania, President of Abkhazia (2020–present)
Prime Minister –
 Valeri Bganba, Prime Minister of Abkhazia  (2018–2020)
 Aleksander Ankvab, Prime Minister of Abkhazia  (2020–present)
 (partially recognised, secessionist state)
President – Anatoliy Bibilov, President of South Ossetia (2017–present)
Prime Minister –
Erik Pukhayev, Prime Minister of South Ossetia (2017–2020)
Gennady Bekoyev, Acting Prime Minister of South Ossetia (2020–present)

President – Frank-Walter Steinmeier, Federal President of Germany (2017–present)
Chancellor – Angela Merkel, Federal Chancellor of Germany (2005–2021)
 (Overseas Territory of the United Kingdom)
Governor –
Ed Davis, Governor of Gibraltar (2016–2020)
Nick Pyle, Acting Governor of Gibraltar (2020)
David Steel, Governor of Gibraltar (2020–present)
Chief Minister – Fabian Picardo, Chief Minister of Gibraltar (2011–present)

President –
 Prokopis Pavlopoulos, President of Greece (2015–2020)
 Katerina Sakellaropoulou, President of Greece (2020–present)
Prime Minister – Kyriakos Mitsotakis, Prime Minister of Greece (2019–present)
 (Crown dependency)
Lieutenant-Governor – Ian Corder, Lieutenant Governor of Guernsey (2016–present)
President of the Policy and Resources Committee –
Gavin St Pier, President of the Policy and Resources Committee (2016–2020)
Peter Ferbrache, President of the Policy and Resources Committee (2020–present)

President – János Áder, President of Hungary (2012–present)
Prime Minister – Viktor Orbán, Prime Minister of Hungary (2010–present)

President – Guðni Th. Jóhannesson, President of Iceland (2016–present)
Prime Minister – Katrín Jakobsdóttir, Prime Minister of Iceland (2017–present)

President – Michael D. Higgins, President of Ireland (2011–present)
Prime Minister –
Leo Varadkar, Taoiseach of Ireland (2017–2020)
Micheál Martin, Taoiseach of Ireland (2020–2022)
 (Crown dependency)
Lieutenant-Governor – Richard Gozney, Lieutenant Governor of the Isle of Man (2016–2021)
Chief Minister – Howard Quayle, Chief Minister of the Isle of Man (2016–2021)

President – Sergio Mattarella, President of Italy (2015–present)
Prime Minister – Giuseppe Conte, President of the Council of Ministers of Italy (2018–2021)
 (Crown dependency)
Lieutenant-Governor – Stephen Dalton, Lieutenant Governor of Jersey (2017–present)
Chief Minister – John Le Fondré, Chief Minister of Jersey (2018–present)
 (partially recognised, secessionist state; under nominal international administration)
President –
Hashim Thaçi, President of Kosovo (2016–2020)
Vjosa Osmani, Acting President of Kosovo (2020–2021)
Prime Minister –
Ramush Haradinaj, Prime Minister of Kosovo (2017–2020)
Albin Kurti, Prime Minister of Kosovo (2020)
Avdullah Hoti, Prime Minister of Kosovo (2020–2021)

President – Egils Levits, President of Latvia (2019–present)
Prime Minister – Krišjānis Kariņš, Prime Minister of Latvia (2019–present)

Monarch – Hans-Adam II, Prince Regnant of Liechtenstein (1989–present)
Regent – Alois, Regent of Liechtenstein (2004–present)
Prime Minister – Adrian Hasler, Head of Government of Liechtenstein (2013–2021)

President – Gitanas Nausėda, President of Lithuania (2019–present)
Prime Minister –
 Saulius Skvernelis, Prime Minister of Lithuania (2016–2020)
 Ingrida Šimonytė, Prime Minister of Lithuania (2020–present)

Monarch – Henri, Grand Duke of Luxembourg (2000–present)
Prime Minister – Xavier Bettel, Prime Minister of Luxembourg (2013–present)

President – George Vella, President of Malta (2019–present)
Prime Minister –
Joseph Muscat, Prime Minister of Malta (2013–2020)
Robert Abela, Prime Minister of Malta (2020–present)

President –
 Igor Dodon, President of Moldova (2016–2020)
 Maia Sandu, President of Moldova (2020–present)
Prime Minister –
Ion Chicu, Prime Minister of Moldova (2019–2020)
Aureliu Ciocoi, Acting Prime Minister of Moldova (2020-2021)
 (unrecognized, secessionist state)
President – Vadim Krasnoselsky, President of Transnistria (2016–present)
Prime Minister – Aleksandr Martynov, Prime Minister of Transnistria (2016–present)

Monarch – Albert II, Sovereign Prince of Monaco (2005–present)
Prime Minister –
Serge Telle, Minister of State of Monaco (2016–2020)
Pierre Dartout, Minister of State of Monaco (2020–present)

President – Milo Đukanović, President of Montenegro (2018–present)
Prime Minister –
Duško Marković, Prime Minister of Montenegro (2016–2020)
Zdravko Krivokapić, Prime Minister of Montenegro (2020–present)

Monarch – Willem-Alexander, King of the Netherlands (2013–present)
 (constituent country)
Prime Minister – Mark Rutte, Prime Minister of the Netherlands (2010–present)
 (constituent country)
see under North America
 (constituent country)
see under North America
 (constituent country)
see under North America

President – Stevo Pendarovski, President of North Macedonia (2019–present)
Prime Minister –
Zoran Zaev, President of the Government of North Macedonia (2017–2020)
Oliver Spasovski, President of the Government of North Macedonia (2020)
Zoran Zaev, President of the Government of North Macedonia (2020–2022)

Monarch – Harald V, King of Norway (1991–present)
Prime Minister – Erna Solberg, Prime Minister of Norway (2013–2021)

President – Andrzej Duda, President of Poland (2015–present)
Prime Minister – Mateusz Morawiecki, Chairman of the Council of Ministers of Poland (2017–present)

President – Marcelo Rebelo de Sousa, President of Portugal (2016–present)
Prime Minister – António Costa, Prime Minister of Portugal (2015–present)

President – Klaus Iohannis, President of Romania (2014–present)
Prime Minister –
Ludovic Orban, Prime Minister of Romania (2019–2020)
Nicolae Ciucă, Acting Prime Minister of Romania (2020)
Florin Cîțu, Prime Minister of Romania (2020–2021)

President – Vladimir Putin, President of Russia (2012–present)
Prime Minister –
Dmitry Medvedev, Chairman of the Government of Russia (2012–2020)
Mikhail Mishustin, Chairman of the Government of Russia (2020–present)
Andrey Belousov, Acting Chairman of the Government of Russia (2020)

Captains-Regent –
Luca Boschi and Mariella Mularoni, Captains Regent of San Marino (2019–2020)
Alessandro Mancini and Grazia Zafferani, Captains Regent of San Marino (2020)
Alessandro Cardelli and Mirko Dolcini, Captains Regent of San Marino (2020–2021)

President – Aleksandar Vučić, President of Serbia (2017–present)
Prime Minister – Ana Brnabić, Prime Minister of Serbia (2017–present)

President – Zuzana Čaputová, President of Slovakia (2019–present)
Prime Minister –
Peter Pellegrini, Prime Minister of Slovakia (2018–2020)
Igor Matovič, Prime Minister of Slovakia (2020–2021)

President – Borut Pahor, President of Slovenia (2012–2022)
Prime Minister –
Marjan Šarec, Prime Minister of Slovenia (2018–2020)
Janez Janša, Prime Minister of Slovenia (2020–2022)

Monarch – Felipe VI, King of Spain (2014–present)
Prime Minister – Pedro Sánchez, President of the Government of Spain (2018–present)

Monarch – Carl XVI Gustaf, King of Sweden (1973–present)
Prime Minister – Stefan Löfven, Prime Minister of Sweden (2014–2021)

Council – Federal Council of Switzerland
Members –  Ueli Maurer (2009–2022), Simonetta Sommaruga (2010–2022; President of Switzerland, 2020), Alain Berset (2012–present), Guy Parmelin (2016–present), Ignazio Cassis (2017–present), Karin Keller-Sutter  (2019–present) and Viola Amherd (2019–present)

President – Volodymyr Zelenskyy, President of Ukraine (2019–present)
Prime Minister –
Oleksiy Honcharuk, Prime Minister of Ukraine (2019–2020)
Denys Shmyhal, Prime Minister of Ukraine (2020–present)
 (unrecognised, secessionist state)
President – Denis Pushilin, President of Donetsk People's Republic (2018–present)
Prime Minister –
Aleksander Ananchenko, Prime Minister of Donetsk People's Republic (2018–present)
Vladimir Pashkov, Acting Prime Minister of Donetsk People's Republic (2020)
 Luhansk People's Republic (unrecognised, secessionist state)
President – Leonid Pasechnik, Head of state of Luhansk People's Republic (2017–present)
Prime Minister – Sergey Kozlov, Prime Minister of Luhansk People's Republic (2015–present)

 Monarch –
 Elizabeth II, Queen of the United Kingdom (1952–2022)
Prime Minister – Boris Johnson, Prime Minister of the United Kingdom (2019–2022)

Monarch – Pope Francis, Sovereign of Vatican City (2013–present)
Head of Government – Cardinal Giuseppe Bertello, President of the Governorate of Vatican City (2011–2021)
Holy See (sui generis subject of public international law)
Secretary of State – Cardinal Pietro Parolin, Cardinal Secretary of State (2013–present)

North America
 (overseas territory of the United Kingdom)
Governor – Tim Foy, Governor of Anguilla (2017–present)
Chief Minister –
Victor Banks, Premier of Anguilla (2019–2020)
Ellis Webster, Premier of Anguilla (2020–present)

Monarch – Elizabeth II, Queen of Antigua and Barbuda (1981–2022)
Governor-General – Sir Rodney Williams, Governor-General of Antigua and Barbuda (2014–present)
Prime Minister – Gaston Browne, Prime Minister of Antigua and Barbuda (2014–present)
 (constituent country of the Kingdom of the Netherlands)
Governor – Alfonso Boekhoudt, Governor of Aruba (2017–present)
Prime Minister – Evelyn Wever-Croes, Prime Minister of Aruba (2017–present)

Monarch – Elizabeth II, Queen of the Bahamas (1973–2022)
Governor-General – Sir Cornelius A. Smith, Governor-General of the Bahamas (2019–present)
Prime Minister – Hubert Minnis, Prime Minister of the Bahamas (2017–2021)

Monarch – Elizabeth II, Queen of Barbados (1966–2021)
Governor-General – Dame Sandra Mason, Governor-General of Barbados (2018–2021)
Prime Minister – Mia Mottley, Prime Minister of Barbados (2018–present)

Monarch – Elizabeth II, Queen of Belize (1981–2022)
Governor-General – Sir Colville Young, Governor-General of Belize (1993–2021)
Prime Minister –
Dean Barrow, Prime Minister of Belize (2008–2020)
Johnny Briceño, Prime Minister of Belize (2020–present)
 (Overseas Territory of the United Kingdom)
Governor –
John Rankin, Governor of Bermuda (2016–2020)
Alison Crocket, Acting Governor of Bermuda (2020)
Rena Lalgie, Governor of Bermuda (2020–present)
Premier – Edward David Burt, Premier of Bermuda (2017–present)
 (Overseas Territory of the United Kingdom)
Governor – Augustus Jaspert, Governor of the British Virgin Islands (2017–2021)
Premier – Andrew Fahie, Premier of the British Virgin Islands (2019–present)

Monarch – Elizabeth II, Queen of Canada (1952–2022)
Governor General – Julie Payette, Governor General of Canada (2017–2021)
Prime Minister – Justin Trudeau, Prime Minister of Canada (2015–present)
 (Overseas Territory of the United Kingdom)
Governor – Martyn Roper, Governor of the Cayman Islands (2018–present)
Premier – Alden McLaughlin, Premier of the Cayman Islands (2013–present)

President – Carlos Alvarado Quesada, President of Costa Rica (2018–present)

Communist Party Leader – Raúl Castro, First Secretary of the Communist Party of Cuba (2011–2021)
President – Miguel Díaz-Canel, President of Cuba (2018–present)
Prime Minister – Manuel Marrero Cruz, Prime Minister (2019–present)
 (constituent country of the Kingdom of the Netherlands)
Governor – Lucille George-Wout, Governor of Curaçao (2013–present)
Prime Minister – Eugene Rhuggenaath, Prime Minister of Curaçao (2017–present)

President – Charles Savarin, President of Dominica (2013–present)
Prime Minister – Roosevelt Skerrit, Prime Minister of Dominica (2004–present)

President –
Danilo Medina, President of the Dominican Republic (2012–2020)
Luis Abinader, President of the Dominican Republic (2020–present)

President – Nayib Bukele, President of El Salvador (2019–present)

Monarch – Elizabeth II, Queen of Grenada (1974–2022)
Governor-General – Dame Cécile La Grenade, Governor-General of Grenada (2013–present)
Prime Minister – Keith Mitchell, Prime Minister of Grenada (2013–2022)

President –
Jimmy Morales, President of Guatemala (2016–2020)
Alejandro Giammattei, President of Guatemala (2020–present)

President – Jovenel Moïse, President of Haiti (2017–2021)
Prime Minister –
Jean-Michel Lapin, Acting Prime Minister of Haiti (2019–2020)
Joseph Jouthe, Prime Minister of Haiti (2020–2021)

President – Juan Orlando Hernández, President of Honduras (2014–2022)

Monarch – Elizabeth II, Queen of Jamaica (1962–2022)
Governor-General – Sir Patrick Allen, Governor-General of Jamaica (2009–present)
Prime Minister – Andrew Holness, Prime Minister of Jamaica (2016–present)

President – Andrés Manuel López Obrador, President of Mexico (2018–present)
 (Overseas Territory of the United Kingdom)
Governor – Andrew Pearce, Governor of Montserrat (2018–present)
Premier – Easton Taylor-Farrell, Premier of Montserrat (2019–present)

President – Daniel Ortega, President of Nicaragua (2007–present)

President – Laurentino Cortizo, President of Panama (2019–present)
 (Commonwealth of the United States)
Governor – Wanda Vázquez Garced, Governor of Puerto Rico (2019–2021)
  (overseas collectivity of France)
Prefect –
Sylvie Daniélo-Feucher, Prefect of Saint Barthélemy (2018–2020)
Mikaël Doré, Acting Prefect of Saint Barthélemy (2020)
Serge Gouteyron, Prefect of Saint Barthélemy (2020–present)
Head of Government – Bruno Magras, President of the Territorial Council of Saint Barthélemy (2007–present)

Monarch – Elizabeth II, Queen of Saint Kitts and Nevis (1983–2022)
Governor-General – Sir Tapley Seaton, Governor-General of Saint Kitts and Nevis (2015–2023)
Prime Minister – Timothy Harris, Prime Minister of Saint Kitts and Nevis (2015–present)

Monarch – Elizabeth II, Queen of Saint Lucia (1979–2022)
Governor-General – Sir Neville Cenac, Governor-General of Saint Lucia  (2018–2021)
Prime Minister – Allen Chastanet, Prime Minister of Saint Lucia (2016–2021)
 (overseas collectivity of France)
Prefect –
Sylvie Daniélo-Feucher, Prefect of Saint Barthélemy (2018–2020)
Mikaël Doré, Acting Prefect of Saint Barthélemy (2020)
Serge Gouteyron, Prefect of Saint Barthélemy (2020–present)
Head of Government – Daniel Gibbs, President of the Territorial Council of Saint Martin (2017–present)
  (overseas collectivity of France)
Prefect – Thierry Devimeux, Prefect of Saint Pierre and Miquelon (2018–2021)
Head of Government –
Stéphane Lenormand, President of the Territorial Council of Saint Pierre and Miquelon (2017–2020)
Bernard Briand, President of the Territorial Council of Saint Pierre and Miquelon (2020–present)

Monarch – Elizabeth II, Queen of Saint Vincent and the Grenadines (1979–2022)
Governor-General – Susan Dougan, Governor-General of Saint Vincent and the Grenadines (2019–present)
Prime Minister – Ralph Gonsalves, Prime Minister of Saint Vincent and the Grenadines (2001–present)
 (constituent country of the Kingdom of the Netherlands)
Governor – Eugene Holiday, Governor of Sint Maarten (2010–present)
Prime Minister – Silveria Jacobs, Prime Minister of Sint Maarten (2019–present)

President – Paula-Mae Weekes, President of Trinidad and Tobago (2018–present)
Prime Minister – Keith Rowley, Prime Minister of Trinidad and Tobago (2015–present)
 (Overseas Territory of the United Kingdom)
Governor – Nigel Dakin, Governor of the Turks and Caicos Islands (2019–present)
Premier – Sharlene Cartwright-Robinson, Premier of the Turks and Caicos Islands (2016–present)

President – Donald Trump,  President of the United States (2017–2021)
 (insular area of the United States)
Governor – Albert Bryan, Governor of the United States Virgin Islands (2019–present)

Oceania
 (unorganised, unincorporated territory of the United States)
Governor – Lolo Matalasi Moliga, Governor of American Samoa (2013–2021)

Monarch – Elizabeth II, Queen of Australia (1952–2022)
Governor-General – David Hurley, Governor-General of Australia (2019–present)
Prime Minister – Scott Morrison, Prime Minister of Australia (2018–2022)
 (external territory of Australia)
Administrator – Natasha Griggs, Administrator of Christmas Island (2017–present)
Shire-President – Gordon Thomson, Shire president of Christmas Island (2013–present)
 (external territory of Australia)
Administrator – Natasha Griggs, Administrator of the Cocos (Keeling) Islands (2017–present)
Shire-President – Aindil Minkom, Shire president of the Cocos (Keeling) Islands (2019–present)
 (associated state of New Zealand)
Queen's Representative – Sir Tom Marsters, Queen's Representative of the Cook Islands (2013–present)
Prime Minister –
Henry Puna, Prime Minister of the Cook Islands (2010–2020)
Mark Brown, Prime Minister of the Cook Islands (2020–present)

President – Jioji Konrote, President of Fiji (2015–2021)
Prime Minister – Frank Bainimarama, Prime Minister of Fiji (2007–2022)
  (overseas collectivity of France)
High Commissioner – Dominique Sorain, High Commissioner of the Republic in French Polynesia (2019–present)
President – Édouard Fritch, President of French Polynesia (2014–present)
 (insular area of the United States)
Governor – Lou Leon Guerrero, Governor of Guam (2019–present)

President – Taneti Mamau, President of Kiribati (2016–present)

President –
 Hilda Heine, President of the Marshall Islands (2016–2020)
 David Kabua, President of the Marshall Islands (2020–present)

President – David W. Panuelo, President of Micronesia (2019–present)

President – Lionel Aingimea, President of Nauru (2019–2022)
  (sui generis collectivity of France)
High Commissioner – Laurent Prévost, High Commissioner of New Caledonia (2019–present)
Head of Government – Thierry Santa, President of the Government of New Caledonia (2019–present)

Monarch – Elizabeth II, Queen of New Zealand (1952–2022)
Governor-General – Dame Patsy Reddy, Governor-General of New Zealand (2016–2021)
Prime Minister – Jacinda Ardern, Prime Minister of New Zealand (2017–2023)
 (associated state of New Zealand)
Premier –
 Sir Toke Talagi, Premier of Niue (2008–2020)
 Dalton Tagelagi, Premier of Niue (2020–present)
 (Commonwealth of the United States)
Governor – Ralph Torres, Governor of the Northern Mariana Islands (2015–present)

President – Tommy Remengesau, President of Palau (2013–2021)

Monarch – Elizabeth II, Queen of Papua New Guinea (1975–2022)
Governor-General – Sir Bob Dadae, Governor-General of Papua New Guinea (2017–present)
Prime Minister – James Marape, Prime Minister of Papua New Guinea (2019–present)
 (Overseas Territory of the United Kingdom)
Governor – Laura Clarke, Governor of Pitcairn (2018–present)
Mayor – Charlene Warren-Peu, Mayor of the Pitcairn Islands (2020–present)

Head of State – Tuimalealiʻifano Vaʻaletoʻa Sualauvi II, O le Ao o le Malo of Samoa (2017–present)
Prime Minister – Tuila'epa Sa'ilele Malielegaoi, Prime Minister of Samoa (1998–2021)

Monarch – Elizabeth II, Queen of the Solomon Islands (1978–2022)
Governor-General – Sir David Vunagi, Governor-General of the Solomon Islands (2019–present)
Prime Minister – Manasseh Sogavare, Prime Minister of the Solomon Islands (2019–present)
 (dependent territory of New Zealand)
Administrator – Ross Ardern, Administrator of Tokelau (2018–present)
Head of Government –
Kerisiano Kalolo, Head of Government of Tokelau (2019–2020)
Fofo Tuisano, Head of Government of Tokelau (2020–present)

Monarch – Tupou VI, King of Tonga (2012–present)
Prime Minister – Pōhiva Tuʻiʻonetoa, Prime Minister of Tonga (2019–2021)

Monarch – Elizabeth II, Queen of Tuvalu (1978–2022)
Governor-General – Teniku Talesi Honolulu, Acting Governor-General of Tuvalu (2019–2021)
Prime Minister – Kausea Natano, Prime Minister of Tuvalu (2019–present)

President – Tallis Obed Moses, President of Vanuatu (2017–2022)
Prime Minister –
 Charlot Salwai, Prime Minister of Vanuatu (2016–2020)
 Bob Loughman, Prime Minister of Vanuatu (2020–2022)
  (overseas collectivity of France)
Administrator –
Thierry Queffelec, Administrator Superior of Wallis and Futuna (2019–2020)
Christophe Lotigié, Acting Administrator Superior of Wallis and Futuna (2020–2021)
Head of Government – Atoloto Kolokilagi, President of the Territorial Assembly of Wallis and Futuna (2019–2020)

South America

President – Alberto Fernández, President of Argentina (2019–present)

President –
Jeanine Áñez, Acting President of Bolivia (2019–2020)
Luis Arce, President of Bolivia (2020–present)

President – Jair Bolsonaro, President of Brazil (2019–2022)

President – Sebastián Piñera, President of Chile (2018–2022)

President – Iván Duque Márquez, President of Colombia (2018–2022)

President – Lenín Moreno, President of Ecuador (2017–2021)
 (Overseas Territory of the United Kingdom)
Governor – Nigel Phillips, Governor of the Falkland Islands (2017–present)
 Chief Executive – Barry Rowland, Chief Executive of the Falkland Islands (2016–present)

President –
David A. Granger, President of Guyana (2015–2020)
Irfaan Ali, President of Guyana (2020–present)
Prime Minister –
Moses Nagamootoo, Prime Minister of Guyana (2015–2020)
Mark Phillips, Prime Minister of Guyana (2020–present)

President – Mario Abdo Benítez, President of Paraguay (2018–present)

President –
 Martín Vizcarra, President of Peru (2018–2020)
 Manuel Merino, President of Peru (2020)
 Francisco Sagasti, President of Peru (2020–2021)
Prime Minister –
 Vicente Zeballos, President of the Council of Ministers of Peru (2019–2020)
 Pedro Cateriano, President of the Council of Ministers of Peru (2020)
 Walter Martos, President of the Council of Ministers of Peru (2020)
 Ántero Flores Aráoz, President of the Council of Ministers of Peru (2020)
 Violeta Bermúdez, President of the Council of Ministers of Peru (2020–2021)

President –
Dési Bouterse, President of Suriname (2010–2020)
Chan Santokhi, President of Suriname (2020–present)

President – 
Tabaré Vázquez, President of Uruguay (2015–2020)
Luis Lacalle Pou, President of Uruguay (2020–present)
Venezuela

President – Nicolás Maduro, President of Venezuela (2013–present)
 Venezuelan opposition (partially recognised, rival government)
President – Juan Guaidó, President of the National Assembly (2019–present)

See also
List of current heads of state and government

Notes

References

External links
CIDOB Foundation contextualised biographies of world political leaders
Portale Storia a list of current rulers by country
Rulersa list of rulers throughout time and places
WorldStatesmenan online encyclopedia of the leaders of nations and territories

State leaders
State leaders
State leaders
2020